The Solo technical routine competition of the 2018 European Aquatics Championships was held on 6 August 2018.

Results
The final was held at 09:00.

References

Solo technical routine